Netaji Subhash Chandra Bose Subharti Medical College  is an Indian medical school located at Meerut in the state Uttar Pradesh. It is a constituent of Swami Vivekanand Subharti University. The college was earlier affiliated to Dr. Bhimrao Ambedkar University in Agra.

Description
The college is recognized by the Medical Council of India , and listed in W.H.O. World Directory of Medical Schools. The college has collaborations with; Centre for Public Health Kinetics, New Delhi, Johns Hopkins Bloomberg School of Public Health, Baltimore, Medical Board of California, and Global Health Learning Opportunities (GHLO) / Association of American Medical Colleges (AAMC), Washington, DC.

The college has constituted various regulatory body and committees including Ethical committee, Pharmacovigilance Committee, College Council, Academic Council, Research Degree Committee, P.G. Committee, Anti-Ragging and Anti-Sexual Harassment Committee, etc. Institutional Ethical Committee (Registration No. ECR/256/Inst/UP/2013) is registered under government of India, Rule 122DD of the Drug & Cosmetics Rules 1945.

Location
The college is located in a 250-acre campus in Meerut. The college has a 980-bed free charitable block as well as the 1250-beds Chhatrapati Shivaji Subharti Hospital and Medical Research Centre on campus. The college also runs a rural hospital: Sardar Bhagat Singh Subharti Urban Health and Training Centre, Multannagar, 5 km away from the campus.

Courses 
MBBS: Admission only through NEET

MD / MS (in all Subjects except Forensic Medicine):

Post Graduate Diploma in Anesthesia (DA): Admission only through NEET

PhD Medical

(Anatomy, Biochemistry, Community Medicine, General Surgery, Microbiology, Pathology, Pediatrics (Neonatology), Pharmacology, Physiology): Admission only through University Central Entrance Examination.

PhD

(Molecular Medicine, Molecular Biology and Biotechnology): Admission only through University Central Entrance Examination.

MSc Medical

(Anatomy, Physiology, Biochemistry, Microbiology and Pharmacology): Admission only through University Central Entrance Examination.

MSc

· Molecular Medicine, Molecular Biology and Biotechnology: Admission only through University Central Entrance Examination.

· Hospital Management: MHA

Admission only through University Central Entrance Examination.

Paramedical courses:

·

Admission only through State Medical Faculty, U.P.

Diploma MLT - Diploma MIT
· Diploma OT Technology

·

Admission only through University Central Entrance Examination.

BSc MIT
· BSc MLT

· BSc OT

· MSc MIT

· MSc MLT

Distance Education: Admission only through University Central Entrance Examination.

· PGDMCH

· PGDHHM

· PGDGM

Departments
The college comprises 30 departments

 Anatomy
 Physiology
 Biochemistry
 Pathology
 Pharmacology
 Microbiology
 Forensic Medicine
 Community Medicine
 Otorhinolaryngology & Head & Neck Surgery
 Ophthalmology
 General Medicine 
 General surgery
 Obstetrics and Gynaecology
 Pediatrics
 Orthopaedics
 Respiratory Medicine
 Dermatology, STD & Leprosy 
 Psychiatry
 Radio-diagnosis
 Radio-Therapy
 Anesthesiology & Critical Care
 Dental surgery
 Cardiology
 Urology
 Nephrology
 Plastic Surgery
 Neurology
 Emergency Medicine
 CTVS
 Neurosurgery

Academic subdivisions
It comprises the following Institutes:

 Subharti Dental College
 Subharti Physiotherapy College
 Subharti's Central Research Institute
 Subharti College of Nursing
 Subharti College of Naturopathy and Yoga
 Subharti College of Pharmacy

References

Private medical colleges in India
Medical colleges in Uttar Pradesh
Universities and colleges in Meerut